The Tinaquillo Municipality (was known as Falcón Municipality before 2011) is one of the nine municipalities (municipios) that makes up the Venezuelan state of Cojedes and, according to a according to the 2011 census by the National Institute of Statistics of Venezuela, the municipality has a population of 97.687. The town of Tinaquillo is the municipal seat of the Tinaquillo Municipality.

Demographics
The Tinaquillo Municipality, according to a 2007 population estimate by the National Institute of Statistics of Venezuela, has a population of 90,773 (up from 74,872 in 2000). This amounts to 30.2% of the state's population.

Government
The mayor of the Tinaquillo Municipality is José Gonzalo Mujica Herrera, elected on October 31, 2004 with 42% of the vote.   He replaced Dimas Ramos shortly after the elections.  The municipality is divided into one parish; Tinaquillo.

References

Municipalities of Cojedes (state)